Fuscopannaria is a genus of lichen-forming fungi in the family Pannariaceae. It has 55 species.

Taxonomy
The genus was circumscribed by Norwegian lichenologist Per Magnus Jørgensen in 1994, with Fuscopannaria leucosticta assigned as the type species. Jørgensen had proposed the genus a year earlier, but the genus was not validly published at that time.

Moelleropsis is a genus that was published by Vilmos Kőfaragó-Gyelnik in 1940, with Moelleropsis nebulosa assigned as its type species. Using molecular phylogenetics, it was later shown that this taxon was nested within Fuscopannaria. Because Moelleropsis was published earlier than Fuscopannaria, the botanical rules for nomenclature indicated that Fuscopannaria be folded into synonymy with Moelleropsis. However, this would have meant that several dozen species would have had to change their names, so, in order to preserve "nomenclatural stability", in 2013 Jørgensen and colleagues proposed to conserve the name Fuscopannaria against Moelleropsis. This proposal was accepted by the Nomenclature Committee for Fungi in 2017.

Species

Fuscopannaria abscondita  – Svalbard 
Fuscopannaria alaskana 
Fuscopannaria albomaculata  – China
Fuscopannaria aurita 
Fuscopannaria cacuminum  – Papua New Guinea
Fuscopannaria caribaea  – French Antilles
Fuscopannaria cheiroloba 
Fuscopannaria coerulescens  – Nepal; New Guinea
Fuscopannaria convexa 
Fuscopannaria coralloidea 
Fuscopannaria crustacea  – New Zealand
Fuscopannaria cyanogranulosa  – China
Fuscopannaria cyanolepra 
Fuscopannaria dillmaniae  – Alaska
Fuscopannaria dispersa 
Fuscopannaria dissecta 
Fuscopannaria frullaniae 
Fuscopannaria granulans  – New Zealand
Fuscopannaria granulifera  – India
Fuscopannaria hirsuta  – China
Fuscopannaria ignobilis 
Fuscopannaria incisa 
Fuscopannaria leprosa 
Fuscopannaria leucosticta 
Fuscopannaria mediterranea 
Fuscopannaria minor  – New Zealand
Fuscopannaria nebulosa 
Fuscopannaria obtegens  – China
Fuscopannaria pacifica 
Fuscopannaria praetermissa 
Fuscopannaria ramulina 
Fuscopannaria rugosa  – China
Fuscopannaria saltuensis 
Fuscopannaria siamensis 
Fuscopannaria sorediata  – eastern North America; Japan
Fuscopannaria subgemmascens  – India
Fuscopannaria subimmixta  – New Zealand
Fuscopannaria subincisa 
Fuscopannaria thiersii 
Fuscopannaria venusta  – Papua New Guinea
Fuscopannaria viridescens  – Siberia; Alaska

References

Fuscopannaria
Lichen genera
Peltigerales genera
Taxa named by Per Magnus Jørgensen
Taxa described in 1994